A dumb iron is  a "curved side piece of a chassis, to which the front springs are attached."

This is an older term, applicable mainly to vehicles built before 1950, and which had their front axle suspended on leaf springs.

At the front of the car, dumb irons project forward, providing a location to attach the front of the leaf springs.

The modern alternative is suspension mount.

References

Vehicle parts